The Great Lakes station is one of two commuter railroad stations in North Chicago, Illinois, served by Metra's Union Pacific North Line. In Metra's zone-based fare system, Great Lakes is in zone G. As of 2018, Great Lakes is the 153rd busiest of Metra's 236 non-downtown stations, with an average of 262 weekday boardings.

It is named for the Great Lakes Naval Training Base in the City of North Chicago.

As of April 25, 2022, Great Lakes is served by 23 trains in each direction on weekdays, by 12 inbound trains and all 13 outbound trains on Saturdays, and by all nine trains in each direction on Sundays.

Like  station, Great Lakes serves as a stop for the Great Lakes Naval Training Center. However, unlike North Chicago station, the Naval training center surrounds much of Great Lakes station, which is also located near the Shore Acres Country Club.

The connection to the Pace bus system has a boarding location near the main entrance to the naval station, it is also a location for taxi pick ups, and drop offs. Parking is available at the end of Ohio Avenue which leads from the southern terminus of the Bobby E. Thompson Expressway.

Bus connections
Pace
 563 Great Lakes Naval Station

References

External links
Metra - Great Lakes Station
entrance from Google Maps Street View

Great Lakes
Railway stations in the United States opened in 1919
Former Chicago and North Western Railway stations
Railway stations in Lake County, Illinois
Union Pacific North Line